Chondrostoma (from the Ancient Greek roots  (khondros) 'lump' +  (stoma) 'mouth' = 'lump-mouth') is a genus of ray-finned fish in the family Cyprinidae. They are commonly known as nases, although this term is also used locally to denote particular species, most frequently the common nase (C. nasus).
The common name refers to the protruding upper jaw of these fishes; it is derived from the German term Nase 'nose'.

Several species have a very restricted range. Some of these endemics are very rare nowadays, and at least one species is globally extinct.

Systematics 
In 2007 it was determined that the presumed monophyletic group consisted of six at least partly independent lineages of Leuciscinae, meaning that the rasping feeding apparatus evolved more than once. It was proposed to split the genus in six in consequence: Achondrostoma, Chondrostoma, Iberochondrostoma, Pseudochondrostoma, Protochondrostoma and Parachondrostoma. But at least Achondrostoma and Iberochondrostoma may not be separable.

Species 
There are currently 24 recognized species in this genus:
 Chondrostoma angorense Elvira, 1987 (Ankara nase)
 Chondrostoma beysehirense Bogutskaya, 1997 (Beysehir nase)
 Chondrostoma ceyhanensis Küçük, Turan, Güçlü, Mutlu & Çiftci, 2017
 Chondrostoma colchicum Derjugin, 1899 (Colchic nase)
 Chondrostoma cyri Kessler, 1877 (Kura nase)
 Chondrostoma esmaeilii Eagderi, Jouladeh-Roudbar, Birecikligil, Çiçek & Coad, 2017
 Chondrostoma fahirae (Ladiges, 1960) (Tefenni nase)
 Chondrostoma holmwoodii (Boulenger, 1896) (Izmir nase)
 Chondrostoma kinzelbachi Krupp, 1985 (Orentes nase)
 Chondrostoma knerii Heckel, 1843 (Dalmatian nase)
 Chondrostoma kubanicum L. S. Berg, 1914 (Kuban's nase)
 Chondrostoma meandrense Elvira, 1987 (Menderes nase)
 Chondrostoma nasus (Linnaeus, 1758) (Common nase, sneep)
 Chondrostoma orientale Bianco & Bănărescu, 1982
 Chondrostoma oxyrhynchum Kessler, 1877 (Terek nase)
 Chondrostoma phoxinus Heckel, 1843 (Minnow nase)
 Chondrostoma prespense S. L. Karaman, 1924 (Prespa nase)
 Chondrostoma regium (Heckel, 1843) (Mesopotamian nase)
 †Chondrostoma scodrense Elvira, 1987
Chondrostoma smyrnae Küçük, Çiftçi, Güçlü & Turan, 2021

 Chondrostoma soetta Bonaparte, 1840 (Italian nase)
 Chondrostoma toros Küçük, Turan, Güçlü, Mutlu & Çiftci, 2017
 Chondrostoma vardarense S. L. Karaman, 1928 (Vardar nase)
 Chondrostoma variabile Yakovlev, 1870 (Volga undermouth)

Footnotes

References 
 Chondrostoma FishBase
  (2007): A new species of Chondrostoma Agassiz, 1832 (Cypriniformes: Cyprinidae) with sexual dimorphism from the lower Rio Tejo Basin. Zootaxa 1616: 23–35. PDF abstract
  (2008): Insights on speciation patterns in the genus Iberochondrostoma (Cyprinidae): Evidence from mitochondrial and nuclear data.

 
Leuciscinae
Cyprinidae genera
Taxa named by Louis Agassiz
Taxonomy articles created by Polbot